Naistevälja is a village in Tapa Parish, Lääne-Viru County, in northeastern Estonia.
It was the birthplace of Hans Verner Puurand, who was the founder of Estonian Marineforces.

References

 

Villages in Lääne-Viru County